Ralph Jamison McConnaughey (August 5, 1889 – June 4, 1966) was a professional baseball pitcher who played for the Indianapolis Hoosiers of the Federal League in .

External links

1889 births
1966 deaths
Indianapolis Hoosiers players
Major League Baseball pitchers
Baseball players from Pennsylvania
Erie Sailors players
Columbus Senators players
Akron Rubbermen players
Muscatine Wallopers players
St. Joseph Drummers players
People from Homer City, Pennsylvania